Sialis mohri is a species of alderfly in the family Sialidae. It is found in North America.

References

Further reading

 

Megaloptera
Articles created by Qbugbot
Insects described in 1937
Aquatic insects